Skelsmergh and Scalthwaiterigg is a civil parish in the South Lakeland district of Cumbria, England.  It contains eight listed buildings that are recorded in the National Heritage List for England.  All the listed buildings are designated at Grade II, the lowest of the three grades, which is applied to "buildings of national importance and special interest".  The parish contains the village of Skelsmergh, and is otherwise rural.  The listed buildings consist of houses and associated structures, a chapel, a road bridge and a railway overbridge, and two mileposts


Buildings

References

Citations

Sources

Lists of listed buildings in Cumbria
South Lakeland District